Harbour City is a tram stop on the Eccles Line of Greater Manchester's light rail Metrolink system. It is located in the Salford Quays area, in North West England, and opened on 12 June 1999 as part of Phase 2 of the system's expansion.

Services

Service pattern

6 minute service to Ashton under Lyne (peak) 12 minute services at off peak times
12 minute service to Eccles (via MediaCityUK at offpeak times).
12 minute service to MediaCityUK (peak)

Connecting bus routes
Harbour City tram stop is served by Diamond Bus North West services 29, 73 & 79, Go North West Orbits 53, travelling between Cheetham Hill & Salford Shopping Centre and Stagecoach Manchester  service 50, linking Salford Shopping Centre in Pendleton, Salford Crescent railway station, Salford University, Salford Central railway station, Manchester and East Didsbury with Salford Quays and MediaCityUK.

References

External links

Harbour City Stop Information
Harbour City area map

Tram stops in Salford
Tram stops on the Eccles to Piccadilly line
Tram stops on the MediaCityUK to Cornbrook line
Salford Quays